Federal Highway 198 (Carretera Federal 198) is a Federal Highway of Mexico. The highway travels from Cruz Grande, Guerrero in the southeast to Tierra Colorada, Guerrero in the northwest.

References

198